is a former Japanese football player and manager. She played for Japan national team.

Club career
Kitamoto was born in Sapporo on June 22, 1983. After graduating from Tokyo Women's College of Physical Education, she played for the Urawa Reds from 2004 to 2010. She was selected for the Best Eleven in 2009. She retired at the end of the 2010 season. In 2014, she came back as playing manager at a new club, the Orca Kamogawa FC. She stayed with the team until the 2015 season.

National team career
In August 2002, Kitamoto was selected for the Japan U-20 national team for the 2002 U-19 World Championship. On June 6, 2004, she debuted for the Japan national team against the United States. She played 17 games and scored 4 goals for Japan until 2010.

Coaching career
In 2014, Kitamoto became playing manager for new club Orca Kamogawa FC. She retired as player in 2015 and she resigned as manager in 2017.

National team statistics

International goals

References

External links

Urawa Reds

1983 births
Living people
Tokyo Women's College of Physical Education alumni
Association football people from Hokkaido
Japanese women's footballers
Japan women's international footballers
Nadeshiko League players
Urawa Red Diamonds Ladies players
Orca Kamogawa FC players
Japanese women's football managers
Asian Games gold medalists for Japan
Asian Games medalists in football
Women's association football forwards
Sportspeople from Sapporo
Footballers at the 2010 Asian Games
Medalists at the 2010 Asian Games